Pratylenchus minutus is a plant pathogenic nematode infecting pineapples.

References 

minutus
Plant pathogenic nematodes
Fruit diseases